The 1996 Miller 400 was the 24th stock car race of the 1996 NASCAR Winston Cup Series and the 39th iteration of the event. The race was held on Saturday, September 7, 1996, in Richmond, Virginia, at Richmond International Raceway, a 0.75 miles (1.21 km) D-shaped oval. The race took the scheduled 400 laps to complete. In the final laps of the race, Robert Yates Racing driver Ernie Irvan would manage to defend and come out victorious against Hendrick Motorsports driver Jeff Gordon, only beating Gordon by a tenth of a second. The win was Irvan's 14th career NASCAR Winston Cup Series victory and his second and final victory of the season. To fill out the top three, Roush Racing driver Jeff Burton would finish third.

Background 

Richmond International Raceway (RIR) is a 3/4-mile (1.2 km), D-shaped, asphalt race track located just outside Richmond, Virginia in Henrico County. It hosts the Monster Energy NASCAR Cup Series and Xfinity Series. Known as "America's premier short track", it formerly hosted a NASCAR Camping World Truck Series race, an IndyCar Series race, and two USAC sprint car races.

Entry list 

 (R) denotes rookie driver.

Qualifying 
Qualifying was originally scheduled to be split into two rounds. The first round was scheduled to be held on Friday, September 6, at 5:30 PM EST. However, only six drivers were able to set a lap before qualifying was rained out and postponed until Saturday, September 7, at 12:00 PM EST. Qualifying was eventually combined into only one round. Each driver would have one lap to set a time. For this specific race, positions 26-36 would be decided on time, and depending on who needed it, a select amount of positions were given to cars who had not otherwise qualified but were high enough in owner's points.

Three drivers would fail to qualify: Stacy Compton, Jay Sauter, and Gary Bradberry.

Full qualifying results

Race results

References 

1996 NASCAR Winston Cup Series
NASCAR races at Richmond Raceway
September 1996 sports events in the United States
1996 in sports in Virginia